The 1967 Surfers Paradise Four Hour was an endurance race for “Production Touring Cars”, held at the Surfers Paradise International Raceway in Queensland, Australia on 9 April 1967. The race, which was organised by the Queensland Racing Drivers Club, was the first Surfers Paradise Four Hour, superseding the Lowood Four Hour race which had been run in 1964, 1965 and 1966.

Outright victory was awarded to the Alfa Romeo Giulia Super entered by Alec Mildren Racing Pty Ltd and driven by Kevin Bartlett and Doug Chivas.

Class structure
Entries were divided into four classes based on price:
 Class A : Up to $1800
 Class B : $1801 to $2000
 Class C : $2001 to $2400
 Class D : Over $2401 to $4000

Results 

Twenty two cars fronted for the race.

 Outright : Alec Mildren Racing Pty Ltd
 First Automatic: Ford Motor Co of Australia
 First Six Cylinder: Howsons Garage

References

Further reading
 Fits rain tyres to beat storm, The Courier Mail, Monday, 10 April 1967, Page 18

Motorsport at Surfers Paradise International Raceway
Surfers Paradise Four Hour